The 2019–20 Dhivehi Premier League was the fifth season of the Dhivehi Premier League, the top-tier football league in the Maldives. The season started on 14 June 2019. TC Sports are the defending champions.

Maziya secured the league title on 19 January 2020.

Since New Radiant Sports Club and Victory Sports Club both teams are suspended, they are relegated to the Second Division Football Tournament.

Teams 
A total of nine teams compete in the league. Fehendhoo and Thimarafushi were relegated from the previous season, and were replaced by 2019 Malé League qualification winner United Victory and 2018 Second Division champion Da Grande Sports Club. New Radiant were suspended due to financial reasons.

Teams and their divisions 
Note: Table lists clubs in alphabetical order.

Personnel 

Note: Flags indicate national team as has been defined under FIFA eligibility rules. Players may hold more than one non-FIFA nationality.

Foreign players

League table

Season summary

Round one & two

Round three

Matches

First round

Second round

Third round

Season statistics

Scoring

Top scorers

Hat-tricks 

 4 Player scored four goals
 5 Player scored five goals

Clean sheets

See also 
2020 Maldives FA Cup

References 

Dhivehi Premier League seasons
Maldives
1
1